Downtown Indiana Historic District is a national historic district located at Indiana in Indiana County, Pennsylvania. The district includes 86 contributing buildings and 1 contributing site in the central business district and surrounding residential areas of Indiana. The district includes notable examples of buildings in the Italianate, Second Empire, and Queen Anne styles.  Notable buildings include the Federal-style William Houston House (c. 1805), Clawson Hotel (c. 1850–1874), Thomas Sutton House, Calvary Presbyterian Church, Zion Lutheran Church, First United Presbyterian Church, and First Methodist Episcopal Church.  The contributing site is Memorial Park, established as a burial ground in the early 19th century.  Located in the district and listed separately are the Silas M. Clark House, James Mitchell House, Old Indiana County Courthouse, Indiana Borough 1912 Municipal Building, Indiana Armory, and Old Indiana County Jail and Sheriff's Office.

It was listed on the National Register of Historic Places in 1993.

References 

Indiana, Pennsylvania
Historic districts on the National Register of Historic Places in Pennsylvania
Buildings and structures in Indiana County, Pennsylvania
1805 establishments in Pennsylvania
National Register of Historic Places in Indiana County, Pennsylvania
Italianate architecture in Pennsylvania
Second Empire architecture in Pennsylvania
Queen Anne architecture in Pennsylvania